Bandvagn 202 (Bv 202) is an amphibious oversnow tracked articulated, all-terrain vehicle developed by Bolinder-Munktell, a subsidiary of Volvo, for the Swedish Army in the early 1960's.

Description

The vehicle is formed by two rubber Kegresse track units with a multi-directional pivot in between. The front unit contains the engine and gearbox through which power is delivered to the front and, via a propshaft in the pivot mechanism, the rear tracks. A hydraulic ram on the pivot "bends" the vehicle in the middle to steer it—there is no braking of track units for steering as on conventional tracklaying vehicles. The controls are a conventional steering wheel on the left hand front of the vehicle. It can reach a speed of 35 km/h on land and 7 km/h (4 kn) on water.

The Bv 202 carries a driver and a commander in the front unit and up to 8 troops or 800 kg in the trailer unit. It can be adapted for other applications.

Production started in Arvika in 1964 and ended in 1981. The Bv 202 has since been succeeded by the Hägglunds Bandvagn 206.

The Bv 202 was designed to transport troops and equipment through snow or boglands in the northern parts of Sweden. The last Swedish unit to use this vehicle was the Cavalry, who found that the manual gearbox Bv 202 was much quieter than the automatic transmission Bv 206.

In the Norwegian army units that had both Bv 202 and Bv 206 ran the Bv 202 as the first vehicle if the snow conditions were challenging. The Bv 202 performed better in deep and/or difficult snow conditions.

The Mk1 Bv 202 is powered by an  Volvo B18, the MK2 by the  B20. It has less ground pressure than a skier and is fully amphibious.

The Bv 202 was used by NATO forces, and replaced the older Swedish Snow Trac ST4 Over-snow Vehicle, which was employed by the British Royal Marines under NATO.

Operators

 1
 - replaced by Bv 206 and Sisu Nasu

 - replaced the M29 Weasel and subsequently replaced by Bv 206
 - replaced by Bv 206
 - replaced "ST4 Snow Trac Over-snow Vehicle" and subsequently replaced by Bv 206
 - donated by Sweden an unnamed amount of vehicles

Civilian operators
 At least 27 ex-Norwegian vehicles sold to Russian company for tourist use in the Murmansk area

See also
Snow Trac

Similar vehicles to the Bv 202 ATV include:

 Sisu Auto Sisu Nasu 
 ST Kinetics Bronco All Terrain Tracked Carrier 
 Hägglunds (BAE Systems AB) Bv206 
 Hägglunds (BAE Systems AB) BvS 10 
 (Ishimbai Transport Machine-Building Plant) Vityaz (ATV)

References

External links
Pictures
The P5 museum
The Munktell museum (Swedish)
Volvo Construction Equipment historical page about BV202
UK site on the BV202
 [www.youtube.com/watch?v=LWf9mnzmXGA Presentation video of Bv 202 (in Swedish)]

Military vehicles of Sweden
Tracked vehicles
Snowmobiles
Two-section tracked all-terrain vehicles
Military vehicles introduced in the 1960s